Inauguration of George W. Bush may refer to: 

*First inauguration of George W. Bush, 2001
Second inauguration of George W. Bush, 2005

See also